John Potter (9 November 1873 – 5 May 1940) was a Conservative Party politician in the United Kingdom.

At the 1931 general election, he was elected as Member of Parliament (MP) for Eccles, but stood down at the 1935 election.

Potter had previously stood, unsuccessfully, at the 1922 general election in Batley and Morley.

References

External links 
 

1873 births
1940 deaths
Conservative Party (UK) MPs for English constituencies
UK MPs 1931–1935